Spar City (also Fisher City) is an unincorporated community in Mineral County, Colorado, United States.  It lies along an unpaved road southwest of the town of Creede, the county seat of Mineral County.  Its elevation is 9,465 feet (2,885 m).

History
Spar City was historically a mining town when the surrounding area was believed to hold much silver ore.  It quickly became a ghost town before becoming a corporation.  It is owned by 35 shareholders, each of whom are given access to a cabin.  Owners are free to make improvements to their cabins, often through the caretaker.

Life
Most owners only come to Spar City over the summer, when they enjoy many activities such as hiking, fishing, and riding ATVs. This is because the summer is the only time the cabins are accessible.

References

Unincorporated communities in Mineral County, Colorado
Unincorporated communities in Colorado